Petrus Leyten (born 16 Jul 1834 in Ginneken) was a Dutch clergyman and bishop for the Roman Catholic Diocese of Breda. He was ordained in 1859. He was appointed in 1885. He died in 1914.

References 

Dutch Roman Catholic bishops
1834 births
1914 deaths